Law of Iceland during the Commonwealth (930—1262) was decided by the Althing. It has changed over the years but the legislative body is still called Althing.

History

Prior to 1262 the law-code was  Grágás.

Following the Gamli sáttmáli, Magnus VI of Norway introduced the law-code Járnsíða, which was itself superseded when existing laws were compiled in the Jónsbók  by Jón Einarsson (in 1281).

The Althing was suspended in 1799, and re-established in 1845 as an advisory body of the Danish king and from 1874 as a legislative body.

The legislative body of the modern Republic of Iceland (since 1944) is again known as Althing.

Uses of old laws
Old laws are still quoted, the 13th century law of Grágás was used in a case in 2017 regarding an injury caused during a friendly fight.

See also
 Icelandic nationality law

References
 Jana K Schulman, The Laws of Later Iceland: Jónsbók: The Icelandic Text According to MS AM 351 fol. Skálholtsbók eldri. With an English Translation, Introduction and Notes (2010) .
 Hans Fix: Wortschatz der Jónsbók. Lang, Frankfurt am Main/Bern/New York 1984, .

Notes

External links 

Read in Jónsbók
Icelandic manuscripts; John Rylands Library (MSS. Icel. 2-5 are copies of the Jónsbók)